Washington "Dodi" Joseph, also commonly known as Dodi Joseph (born 5 June 1950), is a Brazilian former professional basketball player.

Career
During his pro club career, Joseph won the 1979 edition of the FIBA Intercontinental Cup, while a member of EC Sírio.

With the senior Brazilian national basketball team, Joseph competed at the 1972 Summer Olympics, and the 1974 FIBA World Cup.

References

External links
FIBA Profile
CBB Profile 

1950 births
Living people
Basketball players at the 1972 Summer Olympics
Brazilian men's basketball players
1974 FIBA World Championship players
Esporte Clube Sírio basketball players
Olympic basketball players of Brazil
Small forwards
Sociedade Esportiva Palmeiras basketball players
Basketball players from São Paulo
Vila Nova Basquete Clube players